This is a list of electoral results for the Electoral district of Bendigo West in Victorian state elections.

Members for Bendigo West

Election results

Elections in the 2020s

Elections in the 2010s

Elections in the 2000s

Elections in the 1990s

Elections in the 1980s

Elections in the 1920s

Elections in the 1910s

References

 

Victoria (Australia) state electoral results by district